Banchaung is a village of Dawei District in the Taninthayi Division of Myanmar.

Geography
It is located by the Ban River on the western side of the Tenasserim Range near the border with Thailand.

References 

Populated places in Tanintharyi Region